In mathematics, an orbit portrait is a combinatorial tool used in complex dynamics for understanding the behavior of one-complex dimensional quadratic maps.

In simple words one can say that it is :
 a list of  external angles for which rays land on points of that orbit
 graph showing above list

Definition
Given a quadratic map 

from the complex plane to itself 

Then the set  is called the orbit portrait of the periodic orbit .

All of the sets  must have the same number of elements, which is called the valence of the portrait.

Examples

Parabolic or repelling orbit portrait

valence 2

valence 3
Valence is 3 so rays land on each orbit point.

For complex quadratic polynomial with c= -0.03111+0.79111*i  portrait of parabolic period 3 orbit is :

Rays for above angles land on points of that orbit . Parameter c is a center of period 9 hyperbolic component of Mandelbrot set.

For parabolic julia set c = -1.125 + 0.21650635094611*i. It is a root point between period 2 and period 6 components of Mandelbrot set. Orbit portrait of period 2 orbit with valence 3 is :

valence 4

Formal orbit portraits
Every orbit portrait  has the following properties:

Each  is a finite subset of 
All of the angles in all of the sets  are periodic under the doubling map of the circle, and all of the angles have the same exact period.
The sets  are pairwise unlinked, which is to say that given any pair of them, there are two disjoint intervals of  where each interval contains one of the sets.

Any collection  of subsets of the circle which satisfy these four properties above is called a formal orbit portrait.  It is a theorem of John Milnor that every formal orbit portrait is realized by the actual orbit portrait of a periodic orbit of some quadratic one-complex-dimensional map.  Orbit portraits contain dynamical information about how external rays and their landing points map in the plane, but formal orbit portraits are no more than combinatorial objects.  Milnor's theorem states that, in truth, there is no distinction between the two.

Trivial orbit portraits
Orbit portrait where all of the sets  have only a single element are called trivial, except for orbit portrait .  An alternative definition is that an orbit portrait is nontrivial if it is maximal, which in this case means that there is no orbit portrait that strictly contains it (i.e. there does not exist an orbit portrait  such that ).  It is easy to see that every trivial formal orbit portrait is realized as the orbit portrait of some orbit of the map , since every external ray of this map lands, and they all land at distinct points of the Julia set.  Trivial orbit portraits are pathological in some respects, and in the sequel we will refer only to nontrivial orbit portraits.

Arcs
In an orbit portrait , each  is a finite subset of the circle , so each  divides the circle into a number of disjoint intervals, called complementary arcs based at the point .  The length of each interval is referred to as its angular width.   
Each  has a unique largest arc based at it, which is called its critical arc.  The critical arc always has length greater than 

This is not necessarily distinct from the critical arc.

Call this angle .   is in every critical value arc. Also, the two inverse images of  under the doubling map ( and ) are both in every critical arc.

Among all of the critical value arcs for all of the 's, there is a unique smallest critical value arc , called the characteristic arc which is strictly contained within every other critical value arc.  The characteristic arc is a complete invariant of an orbit portrait, in the sense that two orbit portraits are identical if and only if they have the same characteristic arc.

Sectors
Much as the rays landing on the orbit divide up the circle, they divide up the complex plane. Sectors are naturally identified the complementary arcs based at the same point. The angular width of a sector is defined as the length of its corresponding complementary arc. Sectors are called critical sectors or  critical value sectors when the corresponding arcs are, respectively, critical arcs and critical value arcs.

Parameter wakes
Two parameter rays with angles  and  land at the same point of the Mandelbrot set in parameter space if and only if there exists an orbit portrait  with the interval  as its characteristic arc. These two parameter rays, along with their common landing point, split the parameter space into two open components. A quadratic polynomial  realizes the orbit portrait  with a repelling orbit exactly when .   is realized with a parabolic orbit only for the single value 
for about

Primitive and satellite orbit portraits
Other than the zero portrait, there are two types of orbit portraits: primitive and satellite.  If  
Each  is a pair of angles, each in a distinct orbit of the doubling map. In this case,  is the base point of a baby Mandelbrot set in parameter space.
 Satellite orbit portraits have .  In this case, all of the angles make up a single orbit under the doubling map.  Additionally,   is the base point of a parabolic bifurcation in parameter space.

Generalizations
Orbit portraits turn out to be useful combinatorial objects in studying the connection between the dynamics and the parameter spaces of other families of maps as well. In particular, they have been used to study the patterns of all periodic dynamical rays landing on a periodic cycle of a unicritical anti-holomorphic polynomial.

See also
Lamination

References

Dynamical systems